) is a 2019 Brazilian-French weird western film written and directed by Kleber Mendonça Filho and Juliano Dornelles. It stars Sônia Braga, Udo Kier, Bárbara Colen, Thomas Aquino, Silvero Pereira, and Karine Teles. The film, a co-production between Brazil and France, revolves around Bacurau, a fictional small town in the Brazilian sertão that is beset by strange happenings following the death of its matriarch, Carmelita (Lia de Itamaracá), at the age of 94. The film was selected to compete for the Palme d'Or at the 2019 Cannes Film Festival, and won the Jury Prize.

Plot
In the near future, the people of Bacurau, an impoverished, rural settlement in the fictional municipality of Serra Verde, in western Pernambuco, gather for the funeral of Carmelita, an elderly woman seen as the matriarch of the community. Her granddaughter Teresa (Bárbara Colen), now a young woman, returns to town after many years for the occasion, as well as to deliver some medicine to the town. In the following days, the village experiences a sequence of strange events, including the town inexplicably disappearing from online maps and satellite images, loss of mobile phone signal, sightings of a UFO-shaped drone and an unnamed couple from South Region, Brazil passing through town on motorcycles.

There is an ongoing dispute over water rights from the local river, with water being dammed upstream in a corruption scheme which the wealthy mayor of Serra Verde, Tony Junior (Thardelly Lima), is the major driving force behind. He visits Bacurau in an attempt to gain its residents' sympathy and secure their votes for an upcoming election with old food and run down books and no water, but the townspeople all hide and avoid him. A tanker truck of water finally arrives for the town, but it has been riddled with bullets.

When horses stampede through town, two local men are sent to investigate the nearby farm from where they presumably escaped and find the family that owned it murdered. As they attempt to leave the property, they are executed by the couple on the motorbikes. This couple rendezvous with a group of mostly American foreigners led by Michael (Udo Kier). The couple is chastised for killing the two men, as killing two people will deprive the foreigners of two chances to score "points." After receiving unheard instructions through earpieces, the foreigners execute the motorbike couple and argue over who did the killing and is entitled to the points.

The foreigners begin hunting the townspeople, and Pacote (Thomás Aquino), Teresa's former lover, seeks out Lunga (Silvero Pereira), a revolutionary protecting and being sheltered by the townspeople. Pacote convinces Lunga to join his efforts in fighting back against the foreigners. As the townspeople arm themselves, the foreigners kill a nine-year-old boy and cut off electricity to the town.

The following morning, as the foreigners go hunting, they are gradually overpowered and killed by the locals, with the exception of Michael, who ends up captured. Tony Junior shows up to collect the foreigners in a luxury minibus. When he sees that the townsfolk have won, he denies knowing the foreigners until the captured Michael yells at him for help. The mayor is sent away to die in the desert, half-naked and tied up to a donkey, while Michael is buried alive in an underground cell while shouting that "this is only the beginning".

Cast
 Sônia Braga as Domingas
 Udo Kier as Michael
 Bárbara Colen as Teresa
 Thomás Aquino as Pacote / Acácio
 Silvero Pereira as Lunga
 Thardelly Lima as Tony Jr.
 Rubens Santos as Erivaldo
 Wilson Rabelo as Plínio
 Carlos Francisco as Damiano
 Luciana Souza as Isa
 Karine Teles as Foreigner
 Julia Marie Peterson as Julia

Production

Filming
Bacurau was filmed in the village of Barra in the municipality of Parelhas and in the rural area of the municipality of Acari, at the Sertão do Seridó region, in Rio Grande do Norte. The film crew visited over 20 cities in the Northeast countryside to find the right filming location.

Cinematographers Pedro Sotero and Kleber Mendonça worked on the film alongside the production designer, Juliano Dornelles. They have worked on other films together as well including Neighboring Sounds (2012) and Aquarius (2016).

The cinematographer used a Panavision Anamorphic C-series lenses along with a 4:3 digital sensor for the compact and a reliable ARRI Alexa Mini. This stylistic choice came at an expense however, with the specific lenses not being sold in Brazil, the crew had to import them from both the United States and France. The end result, in the opinion of the directors, helped "create this tension between a very Brazilian film and a certain distortion that you associate with classic American films. I think we were very lucky to make the film exactly the way we wanted it to make." The crew shot 12-hour days for 8 weeks.

A self-proclaimed cinephile, Kleber Mendonça Filho, stated in an interview that the cinematographers for the film drew inspiration from several sources, including both 1970's American western style films and Italian westerns from the 1960's.

Bacurau departed from several cinematographic norms during its production. Among these include the use of zooms and diopters which struck many cinephiles as somewhat of a call back to older filming techniques. Another stylistic departure from what many consider to be standard in the filming industry was the lack of a steady camera on set, with the directors opting to use tracks instead: "I have nothing against it; it's an interesting tool. But for this film, we wanted to move the camera using only tracks. By the end of the shoot, the gaffer said we had laid down 1,300 meters of tracks for this film, in eight and a half weeks' shoot."

Reception
The website's critical consensus reads, "Formally thrilling and narratively daring, Bacurau draws on modern Brazilian sociopolitical concerns to deliver a hard-hitting, genre-blurring drama." On Metacritic, the film has a weighted average score of 82 out of 100, based on 25 critics, indicating "Universal acclaim".

Barry Hertz of The Globe and Mail gave Bacurau a favorable review, saying it was a "fiery anti-colonialism polemic with so much on its mind that you'll likely come out of it feeling as dazed as the titular village's people," while Monica Castillo of RogerEbert.com praised its "twists and turns." Additionally, Bacurau received the 'critic's pick' of The New York TImes in March 2020, and was described as "engimatic, exhilarating, and otherworldly". David Friend of The Canadian Press highlighted Udo Kier's performance saying it was "one of his best villainous roles."

Release
It was released by Vitrine Filmes in Brazil and SBS Distribution in France. Its North American release was interrupted by the COVID-19 pandemic, prompting the distributor Kino-Lorber to seek alternate means. It created a "virtual cinema" distribution model in which it partnered with some 150 independent theaters in North America. The first run of the film streams in an exclusive limited release window through the theaters' websites. Kino-Lorber shares the revenues with the theaters.

References

External links
 

2019 films
2019 drama films
2010s science fiction drama films
English-language Brazilian films
Brazilian science fiction drama films
2010s English-language films
Films set in Brazil
Films shot in Rio Grande do Norte
English-language French films
French science fiction drama films
Neo-Western films
2010s Portuguese-language films
2019 multilingual films
Brazilian multilingual films
French multilingual films
2010s French films